Eprhopalotus is a genus of hymenopteran insects of the family Eulophidae. Their distribution varies between species but ranges from Costa Rica, Mexico to Texas. There are currently 5 species of Eprhopalotus:

Eprhopalotus canaliculat Hansson, 2004
Eprhopalotus cordylatus Hansson, 2004
Eprhopalotus crinitus Hansson, 2004 
Eprhopalotus hansoni Hansson, 2004
Eprhopalotus purpureithorax Girault, 1916

While Aabacharis is a synonym of Eprhopalotus, it applies in particular when referring to the species hansoni; hence it has been sourced as both Aabacharis hansoni and Eprhopalotus hansoni.

References

Further reading
Bulletin - United States National Museum. Washington :Smithsonian Institution Press, [etc.];1877-1971.
Catalog of hymenoptera in America north of Mexico / prepared cooperatively by specialists on the various groups of Hymenoptera under the direction of Karl V. Krombein ... [et al.]. Washington :Smithsonian Institution Press,1979-
Experiment station record. Washington :G.P.O.,1889-1946.
Journal of Hymenoptera research. Washington, D.C. :International Society of Hymenopterists,[1992-
Proceedings of the United States National Museum. Washington :Smithsonian Institution Press, [etc.]
 Key to Nearctic eulophid genera
 Universal Chalcidoidea Database 

Eulophidae
Taxa named by Alexandre Arsène Girault